José Chacón is the name of:

José Chacón Díaz (born 1977), Venezuelan professional racing cyclist
José Luis Chacón (born 1971), Peruvian football (soccer) player
José Maria Chacón (1749–1833), the last Spanish Governor of Trinidad
José Pascual de Zayas y Chacón (1772–1827), Spanish military officer